Sediminibacterium salmoneum is a Gram-negative and motile bacterium from the genus of Sediminibacterium which has been isolated from sediments from the Guanting Reservoir from Beijing in China.

References

Chitinophagia
Bacteria described in 2008